Mohammed "Momo" Sylla (born 13 March 1977) is a Guinean former professional footballer who played as a winger.

Club career
Sylla started his football career at French Second Division club Créteil, on the outskirts of Paris, before moving on to Le Havre when he was 18. He also played for Le Mans, before moving to Scotland to sign for St Johnstone, where he was considered to be a fan's favourite. Sylla was also considered to be quite an aggressive player during his time at St. Johnstone, as he picked up 16 yellow cards.

Celtic's manager signed him for £650,000 in August 2001. Sylla played in a variety of different positions while at Celtic, but was never a first-team regular. Celtic won the league twice during Sylla's time at the club in 2001–02 and 2003–04. Sylla contributed nine league appearances to the first of these titles and fourteen to the second.

Celtic released Sylla in 2005 and he then signed for Leicester City at the beginning of the 2005–06 season. He then had a short stint with Scottish Premier League club Kilmarnock in early 2007 and a trial with Nottingham Forest, before retiring.

International career
Born in the Ivory Coast, Sylla played for the Guinea national team internationally making 56 appearances between 1999 and 2007.

Personal life
Sylla is the youngest of six children. He has two brothers and three sisters. From age 10, he was brought up by his sisters in Paris, as his mother, Massiami Bamba, and father believed that opportunities would be better for him than they were in Africa.

He is one of at least two Guinean football players commonly known as Mohammed Sylla. Another, Mohamed Lamine Sylla, played with Willem II, FC Martigues and Ayr United amongst others. The overlapping nature of the two players' careers has led to a degree of media confusion regarding the details of their transfers.

Honours
Celtic
 Scottish Premier League: 2003–04
 Scottish Cup: 2003–04, 2004–05 
 UEFA Cup: Runner-up 2002–03

Individual
 St Johnstone's Player of the Year: 2000–01

References

External links

Living people
1977 births
Association football midfielders
People with acquired Guinean citizenship
Guinea international footballers
Guinean footballers
Ligue 1 players
Scottish Premier League players
US Créteil-Lusitanos players
Le Havre AC players
Olympique Noisy-le-Sec players
Le Mans FC players
St Johnstone F.C. players
Celtic F.C. players
Leicester City F.C. players
Kilmarnock F.C. players
Guinean expatriate footballers
Guinean expatriate sportspeople in France
Expatriate footballers in France
Guinean expatriate sportspeople in England
Expatriate footballers in England
Guinean expatriate sportspeople in Scotland
Expatriate footballers in Scotland